The 1967–68 Oakland Seals season was their first season in the National Hockey League (NHL). It began inauspiciously, with the firing of General Manager Rudy Pilous before the expansion draft. The Seals started their inaugural season with Hall of Famer Bert Olmstead as both coach and general manager, assisted by Gord Fashoway.

Season overview

The team began the season as the California Seals in an attempt to cater to a larger audience, but this did not work it was changed on December 8, 1967 and the team became known as the Oakland Seals. Despite winning the first two games of the season, the Seals won only 13 more en route to an NHL-worst record of 15-42-17. That gave the Seals 47 points, and they failed to qualify for the playoffs in their inaugural season in the NHL. Bert Olmstead served as the first coach and general manager of the team, though in early February 1968 he gave up coaching to his assistant coach, Gord Fashoway; in 43 games Olstead had a record of 10 wins, 32 losses, and 11 ties.

The team was not strong financially; late in the season the ownership group, led by Barry Van Gerbig began to look at selling. There were several interested groups, though two of them wanted to move the team to Canada, and as the NHL's new television contract called for a team in the San Francisco Bay area that was not possible. Attendance was low, with an average of 4,960 people per game, and the team lost an estimated $1.8 million over the season.

Offseason

Expansion draft

Amateur draft

Regular season
On January 13, 1968, 4 minutes into a game against the Minnesota North Stars at the Met Center, Bill Masterton was checked by Larry Cahan and Ron Harris, and fell backwards onto the ice. The force of the back of his head hitting the ice caused significant internal bleeding. Masterton lost consciousness and never regained it: he died two days later.

Final standings

Record vs. opponents

Schedule and results

Player statistics

Skaters
Note: GP = Games played; G = Goals; A = Assists; Pts = Points; PIM = Penalties in minutes

†Denotes player spent time with another team before joining Seals. Stats reflect time with the Seals only. ‡Traded mid-season

Goaltenders
Note: GP = Games played; TOI = Time on ice (minutes); W = Wins; L= Losses; T = Ties; GA = Goals against; SO = Shutouts; GAA = Goals against average

Transactions
The Seals were involved in the following transactions during the 1967–68 season:

Trades

Playoffs
The Seals did not qualify for the playoffs

References
 Seals on Hockey Database
 Seals on Database Hockey

Bibliography

 

California Golden Seals seasons
Oakland
Oakland